The Best American Science Writing was a yearly anthology of popular science articles published in the United States, which commenced publication in 2000. The book series was published by Ecco Press (HarperCollins) and concluded after the 2012 installment of the series. Jesse Cohen was the series editor.  The series is unrelated to The Best American Science and Nature Writing, which is a part of the Best American Series published by Houghton Mifflin Harcourt.

Guest editors
 2000: James Gleick
 2001: Timothy Ferris
 2002: Matt Ridley
 2003: Oliver Sacks
 2004: Dava Sobel
 2005: Alan Lightman 
 2006: Atul Gawande
 2007: Gina Kolata
 2008: Sylvia Nasar
 2009: Natalie Angier
 2010: Jerome Groopman
 2011: Rebecca Skloot and Floyd Skloot
 2012: Michio Kaku

In 2010, HarperCollins also published The Best of the Best American Science Writing. The book combined selections from ten former series editors who each selected their favorite essays for republication in the collection.

See also
The Best American Science and Nature Writing
The Best Australian Science Writing

References

External links
Jesse Cohen at HarperCollins

American anthologies